The 1948–49 Boston Celtics season was the third season of the Boston Celtics in the Basketball Association of America (BAA/NBA).

Draft picks

Roster

Regular season

Season standings

Record vs. opponents

Game log

References

Boston Celtics seasons
Boston Celtics
Boston Celtics
Boston Celtics
1940s in Boston